Sir Alfred William Wiggin  (24 February 1937 – 12 March 2015), known as Jerry Wiggin, was a British Conservative Party politician.

Education
Born in Worcestershire, England, Jerry Wiggin was educated at Eton College, followed by Trinity College, Cambridge. He became a farmer in Clevelode in his native Worcestershire.

Parliamentary career
Wiggin contested Montgomeryshire in 1964 and 1966. He became Member of Parliament (MP) for Weston-super-Mare in the 1969 by-election after the death of David Webster. He defeated Tom King in the selection contest for this by-election. He served until he retired at the 1997 general election. Wiggin was a junior Armed Forces minister from 1981 to 1983 and defended the withdrawal of HMS Endurance from the South Atlantic which, according to The Times, was seen as the trigger for the 1982 Falklands war.

In May 1995, Wiggin apologised to the House of Commons for having tabled amendments to a bill in Standing Committee in the name of fellow MP Sebastian Coe, but without Coe's knowledge or consent.  The amendment – to safeguard gas supplies to caravan sites – benefited a lobbying group which employed Wiggin as a consultant.  His behaviour which meant he avoided having to declare a financial interest upset MPs of both main parties and became known as the cash for amendments scandal.
William Rees-Mogg described Wiggin as "a shrewd politician — though perhaps closer to the intellectual tone of the rugby XV than of All Souls".

He was knighted in the 1993 New Years Honours List.

Family and death
Wiggin first married Rosemary Orr, with whom he had two sons and a daughter. They divorced in 1983, and in 1991 he married Morella Bulmer. One of his sons from his first marriage is Bill Wiggin, Conservative MP since 2001 for Leominster and, following boundary reorganisation, North Herefordshire.
 
Wiggin died suddenly on 12 March 2015, aged 78.

Arms

References

Times Guide to the House of Commons, Times Newspapers Limited, 1997

See also
Wiggin baronets

1937 births
2015 deaths
Conservative Party (UK) MPs for English constituencies
Knights Bachelor
People educated at Eton College
UK MPs 1966–1970
UK MPs 1970–1974
UK MPs 1974
UK MPs 1974–1979
UK MPs 1979–1983
UK MPs 1983–1987
UK MPs 1987–1992
UK MPs 1992–1997
Royal Yeomanry officers
Politicians awarded knighthoods